Ezhumesvaramudayar Temple is a Hindu temple dedicated to the deity Shiva, located at Koyirkkulam in Nagapattinam district, Tamil Nadu, India.

Vaippu Sthalam
It is one of the shrines of the Vaippu Sthalams sung by Tamil Saivite Nayanar Appar. This place is also known as Thalikkulam, Kovilkulam and Koyirkulam.

Presiding deity
The presiding deity in the garbhagriha, represented by the lingam, is known as Ezhumesvaramudayar. The Goddess is known as Palinum Nanmozhiyal.

Structure 
The temple is in the shape of vavval nethi mandapa. There are shrines of Vinayaka, Subramania, Surya, Bairava and Sanisvara.

Location
This place is opened for worship from 8.00 a.m. to 11.00 a.m. and 5.00 p.m. to 7.00 p.m.

References

Hindu temples in Nagapattinam district
Shiva temples in Nagapattinam district